General Vedia  is a village and municipality in Chaco Province in northern Argentina. This village is also known as "La cuna del escudo chaqueño" whose translation is "The Cradle of the Chaqueños shield"

References

Populated places in Chaco Province